A. V. Abdul Nasar was elected to the Tamil Nadu Legislative Assembly from the Bhuvanagiri constituency in the 1996 elections. He was a candidate of the Dravida Munnetra Kazhagam (DMK) party. He came from a Traditional Agricultural Family Ayangudi (Kattumannarkoil)

References 

Tamil Nadu MLAs 1996–2001
Dravida Munnetra Kazhagam politicians
Year of birth missing
Possibly living people